Rosebery is a locality in western Victoria, Australia.

The town was named after Archibald Primrose, 5th Earl of Rosebery who was the British Prime Minister from 1894 to 1895.

References

External links

Towns in Victoria (Australia)